Anthephora is a genus of plants in the grass family, native to southwest Asia, Africa, the Americas, and various islands.

 Species
 Anthephora ampullacea - Guinea, Nigeria, Democratic Republic of the Congo, Angola
 Anthephora argentea - Namibia, Botswana, Cape Province
 Anthephora cristata - from Guinea to Angola
 Anthephora elongata - Democratic Republic of the Congo, Tanzania, Angola, Malawi, Zambia
 Anthephora hermaphrodita - Mexico, Central America, northern South America, West Indies, Galápagos; naturalized in Florida, Hawaii
 Anthephora laevis - Eritrea, Sudan, Israel, Palestine, Jordan
 Anthephora nigritana - Niger, Nigeria, Chad, Republic of the Congo, Eritrea, Somalia, Sudan, South Sudan, Kenya, Yemen, Saudi Arabia
 Anthephora pubescens -  dry Africa from Algeria to Somalia to Cape Province; Iran
 Anthephora pungens - Malawi, Mozambique, Zambia
 Anthephora schinzii - Angola, Botswana, Cape Province, Namibia
 Anthephora truncata - Democratic Republic of the Congo, Tanzania, Zambia, Zimbabwe

 formerly included
see Bouteloua Hilaria Tarigidia 
 Anthephora aequiglumis - Tarigidia aequiglumis 
 Anthephora axilliflora - Bouteloua dactyloides 
 Anthephora belangeri - Hilaria belangeri
 Anthephora punctulata - Hilaria cenchroides

See also 
 List of Poaceae genera

References

External links 
 Grassbase - The World Online Grass Flora

Panicoideae
Poaceae genera